Gonzalo Quesada (born 2 May 1974) is a retired Argentine rugby player who presently works as a coach for Stade Français in France's Top 14.

Biography
Quesada was born May 2, 1974, in Buenos Aires, Argentina. He played for amateur club Hindú alongside the Fernández Miranda brothers Nicolás and Juan.

Quesada won 39 caps playing at fly-half for the Argentine rugby union side between 1996 and 2003. He made his test debut at the age of 22 against the United States on the 14th of September 1996, winning 29:26. He won his final cap on the 26th of October 2003 during the 2003 Rugby World Cup against Ireland in Adelaide, Australia. Argentina narrowly lost the match by one point, but Quesada scored 12 of his team's 15 points. Overall, in internationals he scored twenty or more points in individual matches against seven teams: Canada, Samoa, Ireland, the USA, Wales, Japan and France, and a total of four tries, with a 50% winning record.

He was the top points scorer at the 1999 Rugby World Cup in Wales, achieving 102 points. The English media nicknamed him Speedy Gonzalo due to the extraordinary length of time he took preparing to take kicks at goal.

After the 1999 World Cup, he was invited to play for Racing Club de Narbonne Méditerannée in France. He left Narbonne in 2002 to sign for another French club, AS Béziers Hérault. In 2004 he moved to Stade Français, where he played with compatriots Pichot, Corleto and Hernández.

In 2005 he moved on from Stade to join Pau, but the club were relegated and he soon joined Toulon. In 2007 he returned to his former club Hindú.

Since retiring as a player, Quesada has worked in a number of coaching roles. From 2008 to 2011 he was assistant coach for kicking for the French national team.  Subsequently, he took on the role of backs coach for Racing 92 in 2011, before advancing to become head coach in 2012 after a troubled season for the team.

Quesada moved to Stade Français in 2013, exceeding expectations by taking the team to the Top 14 title in 2015, in the process knocking out top sides Racing 92, Toulon and ASM Clermont Auvergne. He ended a run of previous failures under the leadership of leading international coaches and players, turning the team around in short order. In 2017 Quesada led Stade Français to a 25:17 win over Gloucester Rugby in the European Rugby Challenge Cup final.

In June of the same year reports indicated that he would take up a new position as sports director at the Basque Country club Biarritz Olympique in the subsequent season. However, following the appointments of a new club president and a director of rugby in 2018, it was announced that Quesada would move on.

In August 2018, the Argentinean Super Rugby team Los Jaguares confirmed his appointment as their new head coach in the southern hemisphere's premier club competition. He took charge after Mario Ledesma, who had just taken the team to the play-offs, left to replace Daniel Hourcade as head coach of the Argentinean national team, Los Pumas. In his first year in this role in 2019, Quesada brought his side through a busy schedule to achieving their first appearance in a Super Rugby final in Christchurch, New Zealand, finishing as 19:3 losers in a tight contest, which featured about a quarter of the current All Blacks and the majority of the Argentinean international squad. According to Quesada, the strategy of selecting national team players for the Jaguares side put Argentina in a good position for the forthcoming Rugby Championship and Rugby World Cup.

In June 2020, after the COVID-19 pandemic stopped the Super Rugby season, he returned to Stade Français.

References

1974 births
Rugby union players from Buenos Aires
Argentine rugby union players
Living people
Rugby union centres
Hindú Club players
Stade Français players
Argentina international rugby union players
Argentine expatriate sportspeople in France
Argentine rugby union coaches
Argentine expatriate rugby union players
Expatriate rugby union players in France
Stade Français coaches
RC Narbonne players
RC Toulonnais players
Section Paloise players
AS Béziers Hérault players